Fernando Luna may refer to:

 Fernando Luna (tennis) (born 1958), tennis player from Spain
 Fernando Luna (rugby union) (born 1990), Argentine rugby sevens player
 Fernando Luna (footballer) (born 1990), Argentine footballer